Alf Hurley (15 May 1913 – 11 June 1991) was an Australian rules footballer who played for the Hawthorn Football Club, Fitzroy Football Club and St Kilda Football Club in the Victorian Football League (VFL).

Notes

References

External links 
 
 
 Alf Hurley, at The VFA Project.

1913 births
1991 deaths
Australian rules footballers from Victoria (Australia)
Australian Rules footballers: place kick exponents
Hawthorn Football Club players
Fitzroy Football Club players
St Kilda Football Club players
Port Melbourne Football Club players